De Vlaamse Trofee Deschacht also called Grand Prix Fidea after its sponsor is a cyclo-cross race held in Vorselaar, Belgium, which is part of the Superprestige.

Past winners

References
 Results

Cycle races in Belgium
Cyclo-cross races
Recurring sporting events established in 2000
2000 establishments in Belgium
Sport in Antwerp Province
Vorselaar